Lava Flow Hazard Zones are areas designated by the United States Geological Survey for the Island of Hawaii in the United States. First prepared in 1974 by Donal Mullineaux and Donald Peterson of the USGS and revised in 1992, the maps outline the qualitative hazard posed by lava flows based on the past history of lava flow activity on each of the 5 volcanoes that form the Island of Hawaii.  Zone 1 represents the areas that are most hazardous and Zone 9 the least hazardous.

USGS Lava Hazard Zone definitions

The lava flow hazard zones are based on location of eruptive vents, past lava coverage, and topography.

Zone 1 - Includes summits and rift zones of Kilauea and Mauna Loa volcanoes, where vents have been repeatedly active in historical time.
Zone 2 - Areas adjacent to and downslope of zone 1. 15-25% of zone 2 has been covered by lava since 1800, and 25-75% has been covered within the past 750 years. Relative hazard within zone 2 decreases gradually as one moves away from zone 1.
Zone 3 - Areas less hazardous than zone 2 because of greater distance from recently active vents and (or) because of topography. 1-5% of zone 3 has been covered since 1800, and 15-75% has been covered within the past 750 years.
Zone 4 - Includes all of Hualalai, where the frequency of eruptions is lower than that for Kilauea or Mauna Loa. Lava coverage is proportionally smaller, about 5% since 1800, and less than 15% within the past 750 years.
Zone 5 - Area on Kilauea currently protected by topography
Zone 6 - Two areas on Mauna Loa, both protected by topography
Zone 7 - Younger part of Mauna Kea volcano. 20% of this area was covered by lava in the past 10,000 years.
Zone 8 - Remaining part of Mauna Kea. Only a few percents of this area has been covered by lava in the past 10,000 years.
Zone 9 - Kohala Volcano, which last erupted over 60,000 years ago.

The USGS Hawaiian Volcano Observatory maintains an FAQ intended to answer many of the questions that arise from the map and its various uses.

References

Volcanoes of the Island of Hawaii